Brandon Richards (born February 6, 1967) is an American Track and Field athlete.  He was the national high school record holder in the pole vault and a son of double Olympic Gold Medalist in the pole vault, Bob Richards.  He is the third of four of Richards' sons who all excelled at the pole vault—Bob Jr. finished second in 1968 and Tom won the CIF California State Meet in the pole vault.

Richards began vaulting at age five and by age 18, he vaulted , which stood as the highest pole vault for a high schooler for 14 years. The record still stands as third best jump for a high schooler and the best ever by a Californian.

Richards' high school record jump was set at an All-comers track meet in Eugene, Oregon, not in high school competition. He chose not to compete for his San Marcos High School team during his senior year. As a junior, Richards was the Texas state champion at Midway High School.

That mark is the Richards family record, but not in contention with the 19-foot vaulters in the Olympics. He ranks number 260 on the all-time list. Richards attended the University of California, Los Angeles, where he is ranked as the #10 vaulter in school history.

References

External links
 California State Records before 2000

1967 births
Living people
Sportspeople from Santa Barbara, California
People from Waco, Texas
University of California, Los Angeles alumni
American male pole vaulters
American track and field coaches
UCLA Bruins men's track and field athletes
Track and field athletes from California